The Welsh Automotive Forum, also known as WAF, is a limited company that lobbies the government on behalf of the automotive industry in Wales. It was formed in 1999.

The Board of Directors is chaired by Mark Langshaw MBE, and Robert O'Neil is the Chief Executive.

WAF is part funded by the Welsh Government.

References

External links
Welsh Automotive Forum (company website)

British companies established in 1999
Automotive companies of the United Kingdom